Theo Schneider (born 23 August 1960 in Dortmund) is a German former footballer who became a coach. He was manager of SC Wiedenbrück 2000 until April 2014.

References

1960 births
Living people
German footballers
Germany under-21 international footballers
Borussia Dortmund players
Borussia Dortmund II players
1. FC Nürnberg players
Rot-Weiß Oberhausen players
1. FC Saarbrücken players
Arminia Bielefeld players
Bundesliga players
German football managers
Arminia Bielefeld managers
2. Bundesliga managers
Association football midfielders
3. Liga managers
Borussia Dortmund II managers
Ferencvárosi TC non-playing staff
Footballers from Dortmund